Williamsville is a historic home located at Studley, Hanover County, Virginia. The main house was built between 1794 and 1803, and is a two-story, five bay, brick I-house in the Federal style.  It has a rear ell.  The house features a one-story wood porch surmounted by a balustrade and sophisticated trim, including the fully developed modillioned cornice and the elaborate Adamesque mantels.

It was listed on the National Register of Historic Places in 1985.

References

External links
 Pollard House, Studley Road, Mechanicsville, Hanover County, VA at the Historic American Buildings Survey (HABS)

Houses on the National Register of Historic Places in Virginia
Federal architecture in Virginia
Houses completed in 1803
Houses in Hanover County, Virginia
National Register of Historic Places in Hanover County, Virginia
Historic American Buildings Survey in Virginia